Matúš Turňa (born 11 May 1986) is a Slovak footballer who plays as a right back.

Club career
He was signed by Spartak Trnava in January 2019.

Honours 
Spartak Trnava
 Slovnaft Cup: 2018–19

References

External links
FK Dukla profile 

1986 births
Living people
Sportspeople from Brezno
Slovak footballers
FK Železiarne Podbrezová players
FK Dukla Banská Bystrica players
FC DAC 1904 Dunajská Streda players
Association football defenders
Slovak Super Liga players